Piceol is a phenolic compound found in the needles and in mycorrhizal roots of Norway spruces (Picea abies). Picein is the glucoside of piceol.

Uses
Piceol is used in the synthesis of several pharmaceutical drugs including octopamine, sotalol, bamethan, and dyclonine.

Piceol can be used to make acetaminophen by oxime formation with hydroxylamine and subsequent Beckmann rearrangement in acid.

Anticonvulsants are also possible by Mannich reaction:

Metabolism 
Diprenylated derivatives of piceol can be isolated from Ophryosporus macrodon.

4-Hydroxyacetophenone monooxygenase is an enzyme that transforms piceol into O-acetylhydroquinone. This enzyme is found in Pseudomonas fluorescens.

See also
Paroxypropione, where the acetyl group is replaced by a propionyl group.
Apocynin

References 

Aromatic ketones
Phenols